Mont Risoux (or Grand Risoux) is a large wooded crest of the Jura Mountains, located between France and Switzerland. The culminating point (1,419 m), lying on the border between the department of Doubs and the canton of Vaud, is named Gros Crêt.

References

External links
Mont Risoux on Hikr

Risoux
Risoux
Mountains of Switzerland
One-thousanders of Switzerland
Mountains of the Jura